The 2014 Grand Prix GSB was a one-day women's cycle race held in El Salvador on 6 March 2014.

Results

See also
 2014 in women's road cycling

References

2014 in Salvadoran sport
2014 in women's road cycling
Grand Prix GSB